Meszna  is a village in the administrative district of Gmina Wilkowice, within Bielsko County, Silesian Voivodeship, in southern Poland.

The village has a population of 1,831. It lies on the slopes of Klimczok mountain.

References

Villages in Bielsko County